Robert Barry Hobson Coates (born 18 October 1956) is a New Zealand politician who was a member of the New Zealand House of Representatives as a representative of the Green Party of Aotearoa New Zealand.

Environmental career
Coates worked for the government of Samoa from 1978 to 1980, promoting the development of small business. He has a bachelor of Commerce from the University of Auckland and a Masters in Public and Private Management from the Yale School of Management.

Coates worked at World Wide Fund for Nature WWF-UK from 1991, until 1996. He was an NGO observer on the British government delegation to the Earth Summit (the United Nations Conference on Environment and Development) at Rio de Janeiro in 1992, and was closely involved in sustainable development policy in the UK and internationally.

He was Executive Director of the World Development Movement (subsequently renamed Global Justice Now) from 1996 until 2003. During this time he played a leading role in international research and campaigns on trade and investment agreements, sustainable development, corporate accountability, Third World debt and international aid and development policy.

Political career

Coates was the Executive Director of Oxfam New Zealand from September 2003, and he stepped down on 7 March 2014 to contest the general election for the Green Party in the Mount Roskill electorate. He subsequently developed a programme on sustainability for the University of Auckland Business School, and was Coordinator of "It's Our Future", the campaign against the Trans-Pacific Partnership Agreement (TPPA).

On 5 September 2016, it was announced that Kevin Hague intended to resign from the House of Representatives, and that Coates would replace him as a list MP.

On 7 October 2016, he was officially sworn in as Member of the House of Representatives and member of the Green Party parliamentary caucus.

Coates suggested in a July 2017 post on the left-wing "The Daily Blog" that the Green Party might force a second election if the Labour Party formed a coalition with New Zealand First without the Greens. His comments were challenged by co-leader James Shaw who stated that forcing a hung parliament or second election was "absolutely not" the party's position. As number 10 on the party's list, he was not re-elected when the Greens elected only 8 MPs.

References

External links
 Profile at Green Party of Aotearoa New Zealand website
 Profile at New Zealand Parliament website

Living people
Green Party of Aotearoa New Zealand MPs
Members of the New Zealand House of Representatives
New Zealand list MPs
1956 births
Oxfam people
21st-century New Zealand politicians
Unsuccessful candidates in the 2017 New Zealand general election